"Moe n' Joe" is the 75th episode of the HBO original series The Sopranos and the 10th of the show's sixth season. Written by Matthew Weiner and directed by Steve Shill, it originally aired on May 14, 2006.

Starring
 James Gandolfini as Tony Soprano
 Lorraine Bracco as Dr. Jennifer Melfi
 Edie Falco as Carmela Soprano
 Michael Imperioli as Christopher Moltisanti
 Dominic Chianese as Corrado Soprano, Jr. *
 Steven Van Zandt as Silvio Dante
 Tony Sirico as Paulie Gualtieri
 Robert Iler as Anthony Soprano, Jr. *
 Jamie-Lynn Sigler as Meadow Soprano
 Aida Turturro as Janice Soprano Baccalieri
 Steven R. Schirripa as Bobby Baccalieri
 Vincent Curatola as Johnny "Sack" Sacrimoni
 Frank Vincent as Phil Leotardo
 Joseph R. Gannascoli as Vito Spatafore
 Toni Kalem as Angie Bonpensiero

* = credit only

Guest starring

Synopsis
Knowing that a plea agreement with the FBI would involve the confiscation of most of his assets, Johnny sends his brother-in-law Anthony Infante to ask Tony to convince two businessmen in New Orleans, with whom Johnny is a silent partner, to sell their company so he can get his share. Tony reluctantly agrees, but only one of the pair is willing to sell and he does not press the matter. However, Janice loves Johnny's house. Tony proposes to Johnny that he will guarantee his partners in New Orleans will sell their company; in exchange, Johnny will sell his house at a discount to Janice and Bobby. Johnny, with few options, agrees.

Johnny learns from his lawyer he will have to enter an allocution. In an agonizing decision, he accepts the plea deal. He receives a fifteen-year sentence, forfeiting $4.1 million in assets, and admits in court that he was a member of a New York faction of the Mafia. This is met with anger and contempt by his fellow mobsters.

Carmela again pressures Tony to meet with the building inspector and have the stop order lifted on her spec house project; because of it, Carmela has less time for the family, for shopping and cooking, and is not there to comfort Meadow, who is distressed by her souring relationship with Finn. Tony tells Carmela that the building inspector could not be persuaded and that it is time to sell the spec house.

Janice accuses Tony of being unfair to her and Bobby. He blames them for his being shot by Junior; he ridicules Bobby and does not promote him. In therapy with Dr. Melfi, Tony speaks of resentments dating from childhood and admits he is mistreating her in revenge; Melfi suggests that Janice's "misery" reminds him of his mother. When Tony obtains the house for her, Janice is overcome with gratitude.

While making collections in a dangerous section of Newark, Bobby is mugged by a gang of African-American youths. After they take his money and gun, one of them fires it into the pavement in front of him and sends concrete fragments into his right eye. Paulie calls Tony to deliver the news, and reveals that he is having radiotherapy for early-stage prostate cancer.

In New Hampshire, Vito, who now lives with Jim, admits that he left a family and a job in "contracting" in New Jersey. He gets a job as a handyman and wins admiration in the town by assisting the firefighter team in a rescue operation. Vito and Jim declare their love for each other. However, Vito grows discontented with the slow pace of his new life, and one morning, while Jim is still asleep, he leaves. Drinking vodka from the bottle, Vito rounds a corner on a country road and crashes into a parked Jeep Wagoneer. When the owner refuses to take cash as compensation and walks toward his home to call the cops, Vito murders him and drives away. Soon, he is back in New Jersey and slowly drives through the old neighborhood, stopping momentarily in front of Satriale's before speeding off.

Deceased
Jeep owner: Shot in the back of the head by Vito while walking to his house in an attempt to call the police after Vito damaged his car.

Final appearance
 "Moe n' Joe" marks the final appearance of the character Finn DeTrolio, Meadow's then-boyfriend. The couple later break it off and Finn is only mentioned in future episodes.

Title reference
 While playing with his model train set, Bobby asks his son to watch the "Moe 'n Joe action." The term "Moe and Joe" is in reference to a model flatcar from Lionel (which includes the Moe and Joe characters, a pair of workmen) that unloads wooden boards, as shown in the episode. A model train reference as an episode title will be used again for the penultimate episode of the series, "The Blue Comet."
 The title could also refer to the relationship between Vito and Jim or their relationship as the slang Moe ('mo) for homosexual and Joe as in "regular Joe" for a working-class male.

Production
 This episode marks the first time we see Tony getting the newspaper at the end of his driveway this season. The "newspaper shot" is usually featured in the first episode of each season.
 Following a love scene between Vito and Jim, the director cuts to the image of a train entering a tunnel (Bobby's Lionel) and later Vito sawing wood, metaphors for sex.

Connections to prior episodes
 Sal Vitro was tasked with landscaping Johnny Sacrimoni's land during the Paulie - "Feech" La Manna feud in the season 5 episode "Where's Johnny?"
 Vito kills the civilian the same way he killed Jackie Aprile Jr. in "Army of One"—with a shot to the back of the head.
 Janice pleads with Tony to make Bobby a Captain but Bobby replaced Murf as Captain of Junior's crew in Season 4.

Other cultural references
 Tony calls A.J. Prince Albert when speaking to Carmela.
 The book Jim is reading in bed is The Devil in the White City.
 Janice says Ginny's house reminds her of the Palladian villas.
 Silvio puts a poster on the wall at the Bada Bing! office of the porn movie that spoofs the 2002 film Secretary. This porn movie is titled The Perfect Secretary.
 When Paulie calls Tony to tell him about his cancer, Tony is watching the film The Quiet Man.
 Carlo Gervasi says Bobby's eye patch makes him look like Hathaway, referring to Ogilvy and Mather's famous "man with an eye patch" advertising campaign for C. F. Hathaway Company.
 The football game shown in the Soprano home in the penultimate scene is a Canadian Football League game with the Saskatchewan Roughriders, being called by Chris Cuthbert.
 Silvio refers to landscaper Sal Vitro as ″the fucking Lawnmower Man," likely a reference to the 1992 film, as Silvio has previously demonstrated interest in horror films.
 Tony and Silvio are shown carrying packages containing bootleg DVD box sets of Sands of Iwo Jima.
 When Vito makes dinner for Jim, the wine on the table is from Ravenswood Winery in Sonoma, California.

Music
 The song played in the Dartford bar where Vito, Jim, and the firefighters are drinking is "I Love This Bar," by Toby Keith.
 The song played as Vito makes dinner for Jim is "That's Amore," by Dean Martin.
 The song played on Vito's car radio as he crashes into the civilian's Jeep Wagoneer is "My Way," by Frank Sinatra.
 The song played over the end credits is "Let It Rock" by Chuck Berry. It is about hard work on a railroad as a train is headed down the tracks.

References

External links
"Moe n' Joe"  at HBO

2006 American television episodes
The Sopranos (season 6) episodes